Malinnik is a rural locality (a village) in Ustretskoye Rural Settlement, Syamzhensky District, Vologda Oblast, Russia. The population was 29 as of 2002.

Geography 
Malinnik is located 31 km northwest of Syamzha (the district's administrative centre) by road. Kubinskaya is the nearest rural locality.

References 

Rural localities in Syamzhensky District